Bokht-Ardashir (Middle Persian: Bōkht-Artaxshīr, meaning "saved by Ardashir") was the name of a medieval town in the Sasanian province of Pars. It was founded in the early 3rd-century by the first Sasanian king Ardashir I (r. 224–242) after his flight from the court of the last Parthian king, Artabanus V. In 224, it was incorporated into the administrative division of Ardashir-Khwarrah.

Sources 
 

Sasanian cities
History of Fars Province
Ardashir I